The twenty-fifth season of The Bachelor premiered on January 4, 2021. This season features 28-year-old Matt James, a real estate broker and charity founder from Raleigh, North Carolina.

James was originally cast on the sixteenth season of The Bachelorette featuring Clare Crawley. However, after filming was delayed due to the impacts of the COVID-19 pandemic, he was instead selected to be The Bachelor. The entire season was filmed at Nemacolin Woodlands Resort in Farmington, Pennsylvania due to the pandemic, making this was the first and only season to film in a single location in The Bachelor. James is the first Black male lead in The Bachelor franchise.

The season concluded on March 15, 2021, with James choosing to pursue a relationship with 24-year-old graphic designer Rachael Kirkconnell. However, during the After the Final Rose special, it was revealed that James had broken up with Kirkconnell after her racially insensitive past came to light. On April 28, 2021, James confirmed that he and Kirkconnell were back together.

This was the final Bachelor Nation season to feature Chris Harrison as the host.

Production

Casting and contestants
On June 12, 2020, James was announced as the next Bachelor on Good Morning America. James is the first Black Bachelor in franchise history, and while it was intended and announced as the second African-American lead (after Rachel Lindsay of The Bachelorette 13), the sudden introduction of Tayshia Adams as a co-lead on The Bachelorette 16, made James the third African-American lead of the franchise. He is also the first lead to have not previously appeared on a series in The Bachelor franchise since Matt Grant in season 12.

Notable contestants include Mariela "Mari" Pepin, Miss Maryland USA 2019 and top 10 finalist in Miss USA 2019; Kit Keenan, daughter of fashion designer Cynthia Rowley; Sydney Johnson, daughter of former New York Giants running backs coach and current University of Maryland analyst Craig Johnson; Abigail Heringer, the first deaf contestant in The Bachelor franchise; and Catalina Morales, who was crowned Miss Universe Puerto Rico 2015 and competed at Miss Universe 2015.

Filming and development

As with the sixteenth season of The Bachelorette, the season was filmed in a bio-secure bubble at the Nemacolin Woodlands Resort in Farmington, Pennsylvania, 60 miles southeast of Pittsburgh due to quarantine safety protocols, making this the first The Bachelor season not to film in the traditional Villa de la Vina mansion in Agoura Hills, California, and the first location other than the mansion since season 11.

Contestants
On October 5, 2020, 43 potential contestants were revealed on The Bachelor social media sites. On December 11, 2020, the final cast of 32 women was revealed. In week 3, five new women joined the cast, bringing the total number of contestants to 37.

In week 6, season 23 contestant Heather Martin asked to join the cast, but James declined prior to the rose ceremony.

Future appearances

The Bachelorette
Katie Thurston and Michelle Young were both chosen as the leads for seasons 17 and 18 of The Bachelorette respectively.

Bachelor in Paradise
Season 7 

Abigail Heringer, Alana Milne, Anna Redman, Chelsea Vaughn, Jessenia Cruz, Mariela "Mari" Pepin, Pieper James, Serena Chew, Serena Pitt and Victoria Larson returned for season 7 of Bachelor in Paradise. Chew and Larson were eliminated in week 1. Milne and James quit in week 3. Cruz was eliminated in week 3. Heringer split from Noah Erb in week 5, although they've gotten back together. Vaughn was eliminated in week 5. Redman split from James Bonsall in week 6. Pepin and Pitt got engaged in week 6 to Kenny Braasch and Joe Amabile, respectively.

Season 8
	
Cruz and Brittany Galvin returned for season 8 of Bachelor in Paradise. Cruz quit in week 5. Galvin left in a relationship with Tyler Norris in week 6.

Bachelor in Paradise Canada
Illeana Pennetto returned for the inaugural season of Bachelor in Paradise Canada. She split from Brendan Scanzano in week 5.

Dancing with the Stars

James himself competed on season 30 of Dancing with the Stars. He was partnered with Lindsay Arnold. They were eliminated week 4, finishing in 12th place.

Call-out order

 The contestant received the first impression rose
 The contestant received a rose during the date
 The contestant received a rose outside of a rose ceremony or date
 The contestant was eliminated
 The contestant was eliminated outside the rose ceremony
 The contestant was eliminated during the date
 The contestant quit the competition
 The contestant won the competition

Episodes

Controversy 

Contestant Rachael Kirkconnell faced controversy in February 2021 after she was accused of liking racist social media posts and bullying a girl for dating African-American men in high school. Photos also emerged of Kirkconnell attending an Antebellum South plantation themed fraternity formal in 2018. Kirkconnell later issued an apology for her past behavior.

Host Chris Harrison was criticized for his defense of Kirkconnell after he claimed that "50 million people [attended an Antebellum South ball] in 2018," and "the woke police is out there." He later issued an apology for his comments. A petition to remove Harrison as host of the franchise garnered over 40,000 signatures. On February 13, 2021, Harrison announced that he would be "stepping aside for a period of time" and would not host the After the Final Rose special. On June 8, 2021, it was revealed Harrison would leave the franchise for good.

On February 27, 2021, Emmanuel Acho was selected as the replacement host for After the Final Rose. Acho is the author of the New York Times bestseller Uncomfortable Conversations with a Black Man.

Notes

References

External links
 

2021 American television seasons
25
Television series impacted by the COVID-19 pandemic
Television shows filmed in Pennsylvania